Calytrix breviseta is a species of plant in the myrtle family Myrtaceae that is endemic to Western Australia.

It blooms between August and November producing blue-purple star-shaped flowers.

Often found on swampy flats in the Wheatbelt and the south eastern Goldfields-Esperance region where it grows in sandy-clay to loamy soils.

There are two recognized subspecies:
 Calytrix breviseta subsp. breviseta	
 Calytrix breviseta subsp. stipulosa

References

Plants described in 1839
breviseta
Flora of Western Australia